Joseph Bové (Osip Ivanovich Bove, also known during his lifetime as Joseph Jean-Baptiste Charles de Beauvais; 4 November 1784 — 28 June 1834, all n.s.) was an Italian-Russian neoclassical architect who supervised reconstruction of Moscow after the Fire of 1812.

Biography

Bové was born in St. Petersburg in the family of Vincenzo Giovanni Bova, a painter from Naples who settled in Russia in 1782. He had two younger brothers, Michaele and Alessandro, who also trained in architecture and later became his associates.  Soon after Joseph's birth, the family moved to Moscow. From 1802 to 1807, he studied architecture. Starting in 1807 he worked as an assistant to Matvei Kazakov and Carlo Rossi in Moscow and Tver. As a full-time employee of the Expedition, he was involved in various Kremlin maintenance jobs. In 1813, after the Fire of Moscow (1812) that razed most of the city, Bové was hired by the Moscow Building Commission and assigned to lead the "Facade Department", responsible for the approval of new facade designs and for enforcing the placement of new buildings according to the new master plan's street lines. The plan, however, was not finalized until 1817. Private builders were so numerous that Bové and the city failed to control them. Emperor Alexander, visiting Moscow, was enraged to see buildings painted in all kinds of colors, especially deep red and dark green, and issued a decree that limited the city palette to modest, pale colours.

While the Giliardi Family was rebuilding major public buildings like Moscow State University, Bové was in charge of designing and rebuilding the new Central Squares of Moscow and Red Square. His best known project, Theatre Square, was completed in 1825, however both Bolshoi Theater and Maly Theater were subsequently rebuilt, and the square lost its neoclassical symmetry. In fact, most of his buildings were demolished by accidents or real estate developers:

 Trade Rows in Red Square (1815), with a rotunda dome mirroring the dome of Kazakov's Kremlin Senate, were demolished in the 1880s to make way for the larger Upper Trading Rows.
 Gagarin family mansion in Novinsky Boulevard was destroyed by an air raid in 1941.
 Triumphal Arch by Tverskaya Zastava (1827–1834) was demolished in 1938; a replica was built in the 1960s in Dorogomilovo District.
 Listed memorial building at Tverskoy Boulevard, 26 and nearby was razed by Konstantin Ernst's development company in 2003-2005.

In 1824 and 1825, he participated in the reconstruction of Moscow Manege. He designed numerous private mansions in Moscow, but his most famous work remains the Bolshoi Theatre. Extant buildings include:

 The Intercession Church in Balashikha
 37, Myasnitskaya Street
 Catherine's Hospital in Strastnoy Boulevard
 Military school and barracks in Lefortovo District
 First City Hospital in present-day Leninsky Prospekt
 Two small mansions on the Garden Ring (15, Sadovo-Kudrinskaya)

 Church of St.Nicholas in Kotelniki by Joseph Bové  (on Kotelnicheskaya Embankment)
 His last work, Church of Theotokos, "Joy of all who Sorrow" on Bolshaya Ordynka Street (1831–1836)

Death
Bové died in Moscow in 1834, aged 49, and was interred at the Donskoy monastery.

References
  Biography: Покровская, З.К., "Осип Бове", М, Стройиздат, 1999, 
  Official register of memorial buildings in Moscow (Moskomnasledie) at The Academy of State Fire Service (of Russian Ministry of Interior)

Architects from Moscow
Russian neoclassical architects
Russian people of Italian descent
1784 births
1834 deaths